Jan Šefl (born 10 May 1990) is a Czech swimmer. He competed in the men's 50 metre butterfly event at the 2017 World Aquatics Championships.

References

1990 births
Living people
Czech male swimmers
Place of birth missing (living people)
Male butterfly swimmers
Swimmers at the 2020 Summer Olympics
Olympic swimmers of the Czech Republic